Lojze is a given name. Notable people with the name include:

Lojze Bratuž (1902–1937), Slovene choirmaster and composer, killed by Italian Fascist squads
Lojze Grozde, Slovenian student murdered by partisans during World War II
Lojze Kovačič (1928–2004), Slovene writer
Lojze Krakar (1926–1995), Slovene poet, translator, editor, literary historian, and essayist
Lojze Logar (born 1944), Slovenian painter, graphic artist and professor
Lojze Peterle (born 1948), Slovenian politician
Lojze Slak (1932–2011), Slovenian musician
Lojze Spazzapan (1889–1958), Italian painter from the Slovene community in Italy
Lojze Ude (1896–1982), Slovenian lawyer, journalist and historian
Lojze Zupanc (1906–1973), Slovene writer, poet, playwright and journalist

See also
Loje
Loze (disambiguation)

Slovene masculine given names